Les Mariages samnites (The Samnite Marriages) is an opéra comique, described as a drame lyrique, in three acts by André Grétry, The French text was by Barnabé Farmian Durosoy based on a work by Jean François Marmontel.

Performance history

It was first performed on 12 June 1776 by the Comédie-Italienne (with which the Opéra-Comique was merged at that time) at the Hôtel de Bourgogne in Paris.

Roles

References

Sources

Period sources
Original libretto: Les Mariages Samnites, Drame lyrique en 3 Actes et en Prose (new edition), Paris, Duchesne, 1776 (accessible for free online at Gallica - B.N.F. 
Period printed score: Les Mariages Samnites Drame lyrique en 3 Actes et en Prose, Paris, Dezauche, s.d. (accessible for free online at Gallica - B.N.F.)

Modern sources
 Michel Brenet Grétry: sa vie et ses œuvres (F. Hayez, 1884)
 David Charlton Grétry and the Growth of Opéra Comique (Cambridge University Press, 1986)
 Ronald Lessens Grétry ou Le triomphe de l'Opéra-Comique (L'Harmattan, 2007)
 Mariages samnites, Les by Michael Fend, in 'The New Grove Dictionary of Opera', ed. Stanley Sadie (London, 1992) 
 Kutsch, K. J. and  Riemens, Leo (2003). Großes Sängerlexikon (fourth edition, in German). Munich: K. G. Saur. .

Opéras comiques
French-language operas
Operas by André Grétry
Operas
1776 operas